The Procuraduría Federal del Consumidor, or Office of the Federal Prosecutor for the Consumer (PROFECO, for short), is an organization of the Mexican government led by on the Attorney General. Mexico became the second Latin American nation to pass a Federal Consumer Protection Law, on February 5, 1976, and later became the first to create an Office for the Prosecutor. By 1982, the Office had 32 representations, one in each state and one in the Federal District. PROFECO has in total 51 offices all over the republic, and its main office is in Mexico City. The most recent reform of this federal law was signed by the Mexican president Enrique Peña Nieto at the beginning of 2018.

PROFECO works together with other organizations like CPSC (U.S. Consumer Product Safety Commission) from the United States. and Health Canada from Canada to guarantee that imported products are safe for consumers. In February 2018, the representatives of these three organizations met in the U.S. to sign a memorandum of understanding (MOU). With this agreement these three countries compromised to ensure the quality of imported products for south and North American consumers. The representative of PROFECO in this meeting was the attorney Rogelio Cerda Perez, who has been the federal consumer attorney since August 2017.

Objectives  

 Protect consumers against abuses or fraud by companies operating in Mexico.                                                                                                          
 Provide information to help consumers make good decisions when they need to buy products.
 Inform the community about their rights and obligations as consumers.
 Create and put in practice new methods to provide prompt attention for consumer complaints.

Programs
 The Good Weekend (El Buen Fin): a shopping weekend intended to stimulate the economy by encouraging consumption
 Who is Who on the Prices (Quien es Quien en los Precios (QQP)): PROFECO collects information about prices of products that consumers buy regularly. They make a list comparing the prices of these products at different stores, and share this information with the consumers to help them decide where is the best place to buy.
 Consumer magazine: PROFECO has published this monthly magazine for more than 40 years. In this magazine consumers will find a wide variety of information about daily life, like comparison of products, recipes, studies and alerts.

Current Commissioners

See also 

 United States–Mexico–Canada Agreement
 Canada–Mexico relations
 Mexico–United States relations
 Toy safety
 El Buen Fin

References

External links 

 
 https://www.cpsc.gov/content/cpsc-profeco-and-health-canada-issue-joint-statement-on-the-fourth-north-america-product
 https://elbuenfin.profeco.gob.mx/

Federal law enforcement agencies of Mexico
Prosecution
Consumer rights agencies